Octy  may refer to:

 "Octy" Graham (c. 1885–1927), American football player
 Octy, a character in the arcade game Baraduke